Lobo may refer to:

Places
Lobo, Batangas, a municipality in the Philippines
Lobo, Texas, a ghost town
Lobo, Indonesia
Lobo, Cameroon, a town in Cameroon
Lobo Hill, near Belchite, Aragon, Spain
Lobo, Ontario, near London, Ontario, Canada

People
Lobo (musician) (born 1943), Roland Kent LaVoie, singer-songwriter
Lobo (surname), a family name
Lobo (wrestler) (born 1975), stage name of Joseph Eubanks, American professional wrestler 
"El Lobo", code name for Mikel Lejarza, a Spanish intelligence service operative
Mr. Lobo (born 1970), American horror host
Lobo Ismail (born 1974), Jordanian singer

Arts and entertainment

Films
Lobo, an alternative name for the 1932 film Trailing the Killer
El Lobo, the original Spanish title of the 2004 film The Wolf

Music
Los Lobos, an American rock band
Also see "Lobo" in the People section.

Television
The Misadventures of Sheriff Lobo (later just Lobo), an 1979–1981 series on NBC
Lobo (TV series), a 2008 Filipino series
Lobo, a 2000 adult animated black comedy web series based on the DC Comics antihero of the same name

Literature
Lobo, a 1972 book of poetry by William Childress

Fictional characters
Lobo (DC Comics), a superhuman anti-hero published by DC Comics
Lobo (Dell Comics), a Western comic book character considered the first African-American to star in his own book
Lobo, a character played by Tor Johnson in several 1950s horror B-movies
The title character of 1962 Disney film The Legend of Lobo
The title character of "Lobo the King of Currumpaw", a story by Ernest Thompson Seton

College sports
New Mexico Lobos, the athletics team of University of New Mexico
Lobo (mascot), a University of New Mexico mascot
Sul Ross State Lobos, the athletics team of Sul Ross State University

Other uses
Lobo, Mexican wolf (Canis lupus baileyi)
LOBO, a common acronym for lender option borrower option, a long-term financial product available in the UK
Lobo, a cultivar of apple from Canada
Lobo, an alternative name for Zambo in the racial classification of colonial Mexico
Ford Lobo, an alternative name for Ford F-150, a pickup truck
Hafei Lobo, a car
Lobo Systems, manufacturer of the Max-80 personal computer